Strathblane railway station served the village of Strathblane, Stirling, Scotland from 1867 to 1951 on the Blane Valley Railway.

History 
The station opened on 1 July 1867 by the North British Railway. There was a siding on the north side with a dock. The station closed to passengers on 1 October 1951.

References

External links 

Disused railway stations in Stirling (council area)
Railway stations in Great Britain opened in 1867
Railway stations in Great Britain closed in 1951
Former North British Railway stations
1867 establishments in Scotland
1951 disestablishments in Scotland